Sing for Your Supper is a 1941 American musical comedy film directed by Charles Barton and starring Jinx Falkenburg.

External links

1941 films
1941 musical comedy films
1940s romantic musical films
American black-and-white films
American musical comedy films
American romantic musical films
Columbia Pictures films
Films directed by Charles Barton
Films scored by Carmen Dragon
1940s English-language films
1940s American films